is a Japanese actor and comedian. He was interested in plays since childhood. After he graduated from Toyotama High School in Japan, he joined a theatrical company and appeared on the stage. Later, he jumped at the opportunity to be an entertainer when he took the gold medal at the audition called "Birth of Comedians". Then, he started garnering roles on Japanese TV. Shows he appeared on include Fuji TV's Evil Grandmother and NHK's RinRinto.

He performs in Life Never Stops by himself at GyanGyan Theater in Shibuya. Furthermore, he has had starring roles in major art-house films, including Ota in the Edward Yang's Yi Yi, the title character in Jun Ichikawa's Tony Takitani (an adaptation of the Haruki Murakami short story), the role of Japanese Emperor Hirohito in Aleksandr Sokurov's 2005 film, The Sun and Inoue Masashige in Martin Scorsese's Silence.

Filmography

Films
 Sorekara (1985), Terao
 Sorobanzuku (1986), Hanazuki
 Tora-san's Bluebird Fantasy (1986), Train conductor
 Tora-san Goes North (1987), The doctor
 Bu Su (1987), Kitazaki
 Tora-san Plays Daddy (1987), Police officer
 Kaisha monogatari: Memories of You (1988), Salesman
 Shaso (1989), Hirofumi Takeshita
 Tora-san Goes to Vienna (1989), Travel agency worker
 Tora-san, My Uncle (1989), Old man on the train
 Future Memories: Last Christmas (1992), Mysterious man
 Yi Yi (2000), Ota
 Tony Takitani (2004), Tony Takitani
 The Sun (2005), Hirohito
 The Homeless Student (2008), Ichirō Tamura
 Library Wars (2013), Kurato Tōma
 Teacher and Stray Cat (2015), Kyoichi Morii
 Hero (2015), Takao Kinoshita
 Silence (2016), Inoue Masashige
 Magic Kimono (2017) (Latvian and Japan co production)
 When Will You Return? (2017), Tadashi Ashimura
 The Miracle of Crybaby Shottan (2018), Kazuo Kudō
 The Manga Master (2018), Kitazawa Rakuten
 Sorokin no mita Sakura (2019)
 Hakai no Hi (2020)
 Onoda (2021), Yoshimi Taniguchi
 Deemo: Memorial Keys (2022), Nutcracker

Television
 Dokuganryū Masamune (1987), Kokubu Morishige
 Priceless (2012), Shū Zaizen
 Smoking Gun (2014), Shigeru Tasaka
 Quartet (2017), Yutaka Iemori
 Sakanoue Animal Clinic Story (2018), Zenjirō Tokumaru
 Manpuku (2018), Kazutaka Gōda
 Idaten (2019), Hidejirō Nagata
 Scarlet (2019)
 Yuganda Hamon (2019), Kakiuchi
 Taiyō no Ko (2020)
 Reach Beyond the Blue Sky (2021), Minomura Rizaemon
 Taiga Drama ga Umareta Hi (2023)
 What Will You Do, Ieyasu? (2023), Torii Tadayoshi

Dubbing
 Legend of the Demon Cat (2018), Emperor Xuanzong of Tang (Zhang Luyi)

References

 The Japan Times: "Issey Ogata: Comic chameleon" (6 March 2005). Retrieved on 11 March 2009.

External links
 Official website

Japanese male actors
Living people
People from Fukuoka
Japanese comedians
1952 births